Marzi is a 2020 Indian Hindi-language crime thriller streaming television series that aired on an Indian OTT platform, Voot. The story is based on the novel Liar, written by Jack and Harry Williams. The series stars Rajeev Khandelwal and Aahana Kumra. The show is directed by Anil Senior. The six episode series was aired on Voot on 3 March 2020.

Plot 

The story is set amidst the picturesque locales of Shimla wherein Sameera Chauhan (Aahana Kumra), a cheerful school teacher is all set to give love a shot again after an ugly breakup with her fiance Nitin (Rajeev Siddhartha). She agrees to go on a dinner date with the charming and respectable surgeon Anurag Saraswat (Rajeev Khandelwal) but which soon turns out to be a nightmare for her. Sameera wakes up to find out that she is sexually assaulted and is convinced that Anurag is the culprit.

Cast 

 Rajeev Khandelwal as Anurag Saraswat
 Suhaas Ahuja as Shaan
 Aahana Kumra as Sameera Chauhan
 Vivek Mushran as Subodh
 Rajeev Siddhartha as Nitin
 Shivani Tanksale as Isha
 Abhay verma as Ayaan
 Amit Jairath as Dinesh

Episodes

References

External links

Indian web series
Internet properties established in 2020